The William Campbell House, at 164 Norfolk St. in Park City, Utah, was built around 1900.  It was listed on the National Register of Historic Places in 1984.

It is a one-story frame pyramid house.

It was probably owned by a William Campbell.

The house may no longer exist.

References

Park City, Utah
National Register of Historic Places in Summit County, Utah
Houses completed in 1900
1900 establishments in Utah